S-word may refer to:

Shit, a vulgarism for feces, and a general swearword
S-Word, a Japanese rapper and playable character exclusively in the Japanese version of Def Jam Vendetta
The "S" Word: a Short History of An American Tradition ... Socialism, a book by John Nichols

See also
 Sword (disambiguation)